Nitrogen-13 (13N) is a radioisotope of nitrogen used in positron emission tomography (PET). It has a half-life of a little under ten minutes, so it must be made at the PET site. A cyclotron may be used for this purpose.

Nitrogen-13 is used to tag ammonia molecules for PET myocardial perfusion imaging.

Production
Nitrogen-13 is used in medical PET imaging in the form of 13N-labelled ammonia. It can be produced with a medical cyclotron, using a target of pure water with a trace amount of ethanol. The reactants are oxygen-16 (present as H2O) and a proton, and the products are nitrogen-13 and an alpha particle (helium-4).

1H + 16O → 13N + 4He

The proton must be accelerated to have total energy greater than 5.66 MeV. This is the threshold energy for this reaction, as it is endothermic (i.e., the mass of the products is greater than the reactants, so energy needs to be supplied which is converted to mass). For this reason, the proton needs to carry extra energy to induce the nuclear reaction.

The energy difference is actually 5.22 MeV, but if the proton only supplied this energy, the reactants would be formed with no kinetic energy. As momentum must be conserved, the true energy that needs to be supplied by the proton is given by:

The presence of ethanol (at a concentration of ~5mM/litre) in aqueous solution allows the convenient formation of ammonia as nitrogen-13 is produced. Other routes of producing 13N-labelled ammonia exist, some of which facilitate co-generation of other light radionuclides for diagnostic imaging.

Nitrogen-13 plays a significant role in the CNO cycle, which is the dominant source of energy in main-sequence stars more massive than 1.5 times the mass of the Sun.

Lightning may have a role in the production of nitrogen-13.

External links
PET site of the University of Melbourne

References

Isotopes of nitrogen
Positron emitters
Medical isotopes